Park Seung-ju (born September 15, 1990 in Seoul) is a South Korean speed-skater.

Park competed at the 2014 Winter Olympics for South Korea. In the 500 metres she finished 26th overall, and in the 1000 metres she was 31st.

As of September 2014, Park's best performance at the World Single Distance Speed Skating Championships is 20th, in the 2013 1000m. Her best performance at the World Sprint Speed Skating Championships is 16th, in 2014. Park also won a silver medal at the 2007 World Junior Speed Skating Championships.

Park made her World Cup debut in November 2012. As of September 2014, Park's top World Cup finish is 20th in a 1000m race at Harbin in 2012–13. Her best overall finish in the World Cup is 38th, in the 2012–13 1000m.

Her sister Park Seung-hi and her brother Park Se-yeong are short track speed skaters.

Education
Dankook University
Seongnam Seohyun High School

References

External links
 
 

1990 births
Living people
South Korean female speed skaters
Speed skaters at the 2014 Winter Olympics
Olympic speed skaters of South Korea
Universiade medalists in speed skating
Speed skaters from Seoul
Dankook University alumni
Universiade silver medalists for South Korea
Competitors at the 2013 Winter Universiade
21st-century South Korean women